Sander van Looy (born 29 May 1997) is a Dutch professional footballer who last played as a centre back for Allsvenskan club Falkenbergs FF.

Professional career
Van Looy joined PEC Zwolle in 2012, and on 11 October 2017 signed his first professional contract for 1+2 years. Van Looy made his professional debut for PEC Zwolle in a 4–0 Eredivisie loss to ADO Den Haag on 22 December 2017.

References

External links
 
 
 Eredivisie Profile

1997 births
Living people
People from Epe, Netherlands
Association football defenders
Dutch footballers
PEC Zwolle players
Eredivisie players
Falkenbergs FF players
Allsvenskan players
Dutch expatriate footballers
Expatriate footballers in Sweden
Dutch expatriate sportspeople in Sweden
Footballers from Gelderland